Gord McNeilly is a Canadian politician, who was elected to the Legislative Assembly of Prince Edward Island in the 2019 Prince Edward Island general election. He represents the district of Charlottetown-West Royalty as a member of the Liberal Party of Prince Edward Island.

In the 2015 provincial election, he ran as the NDP candidate in the district of Charlottetown-Lewis Point, coming in a close second (30.67%) after the Liberal Kathleen Casey (34.26%).

References 

Living people
Prince Edward Island Liberal Party MLAs
People from Charlottetown
21st-century Canadian politicians
Year of birth missing (living people)
Black Canadian politicians
Canadian people of Trinidad and Tobago descent